Sanguineti is a surname. Notable people with the surname include:

Corrado Sanguineti (born 1964), Italian Roman Catholic bishop
Edoardo Sanguineti (1930–2010), Italian poet
Giulio Sanguineti (born 1932), Italian Catholic bishop
Ilaria Sanguineti (born 1994), Italian racing cyclist
Nenne Sanguineti Poggi (1909–2012), Italian painter
Raúl Sanguineti (1933–2000), Argentine chess player

See also
Sanguinetti, an Italian surname